(July 22, 1937 – November 27, 1999)  was a Japanese professional wrestler and trainer best known by his ring name . He trained many professional wrestlers including Hulk Hogan, The Great Muta, "Mr. Wonderful" Paul Orndorff, Scott Hall, Lex Luger, "Cowboy" Bob Orton, and Ron Simmons.

Professional wrestling career
Kojima played an active role as an ace pitcher at baseball in Nittai Ebara High School Baseball Club in Japan, and after graduating, he joined Japan Pro Wrestling in 1957, but left in 1960. Then Matsuda went to Peru. In Peru, he worked in the name of Ernesto Kojima. Later, after moving to Mexico through the United States, the ring name was changed to Kojima Saito, Great Matsuda, and Hiro Matsuda. The name “Matsuda” was a ring name given to two Japanese wrestlers active in the mainland of America, “Sorakichi Matsuda” in the 1880s and Manjiro "Matty" Matsuda in the 1920s. He initially debuted under his real name at Rikidōzan's Japanese Wrestling Association. 

When wrestling in Mexico, he had matches against the legendary luchador El Santo, and he later studied with Karl Gotch in the United States in order to learn catch-as-catch-can and submission wrestling. During this period he learned one of his finishing maneuvers, the German suplex hold. Kojima adopted his Hiro Matsuda identity while competing in the southern United States, inspired by earlier wrestlers Sorakichi Matsuda and Matty Matsuda. Over this period he would also wrestle occassionally in Japan, where he formed a tag team with Antonio Inoki.

Matsuda was the first Japanese wrestler to win a National Wrestling Alliance world singles title when he won its Junior Heavyweight Championship on July 11, 1964, in Tampa, Florida by defeating Danny Hodge, which he held until dropping it to Angelo Savoldi on November 13th of the same year. He would win a second title in 1975 defeating Ken Mantell, also later losing the belt to Hodge. After issuing several challenges to the champion, Matsuda's match against NWA World Heavyweight Champion Lou Thesz on December 10, 1964 in Jacksonville, Florida, ended without a winner as a result of a time limit draw. 

Matsuda settled in Florida in 1962, and later trained neophytes at the old Sportatorium in Tampa, home of the Championship Wrestling from Florida television program. As a trainer, Matsuda was famous for being very stiff with his trainees to toughen them up. His most famous student was Hulk Hogan who he started training in 1976. For many years Hogan and other wrestlers told a story that Matsuda broke Hogan's leg on his first day of training, to teach him to respect professional wrestling, and see if he really wanted to be part of the business. In reality on his first day of training, Hogan sprained an ankle. He came back the next day and tried to train on it. Matsuda saw it was all black and blue and told him he'd better sit it out for a week. After a week, he was back. Hogan later embellished that Matsuda broke his leg to not only make himself look tough for continuing to train under Matsuda, but also to show the seriousness of professional wrestling. Matsuda wouldn't let wrestlers train with him unless they did 1,000 pushups and 1,000 squats.

In 1987 he began working with Jim Crockett Promotions as a heel to participate in a feud between his disciple Lex Luger and Dusty Rhodes. While there, he also wrestled television matches with Four Horsemen James J Dillon acting as his manager. During the Luger-Rhodes feud, he was billed as "The Master of the Japanese Sleeper," a sleeper hold. During a match within the feud, Matsuda locked Johnny Weaver, who was in Rhodes' corner for one of the matches, in the hold, and the prolonged application of the hold caused Weaver to bleed profusely from the mouth. In the coming years, Matsuda worked for World Championship Wrestling as the manager in early 1989 for the Yamasaki Corporation (a renamed Four Horsemen) as well as working with Terry Funk's stable, The J-Tex Corporation, as their business agent from Japan. As a mouth-piece for various Japanese wrestlers on American television, he "introduced" wrestlers including The Great Muta. His last match professional match was against Osamu Kido at the age of 53 on December 26, 1990 in Hamamatsu, Japan, in an event that also featured Lou Thesz, who also wrestled his last professional match, and Nick Bockwinkel.

Death
Kojima died on November 27, 1999 in Tampa, Florida of colon cancer and liver cancer; he was 62 years old.

Championships and accomplishments

Championship Wrestling from Florida
NWA Florida Tag Team Championship (4 times) - with Mr. Wrestling (1), Bob Orton (1), and the Missouri Mauler (2)
NWA Southern Heavyweight Championship (Florida version) (4 times)
NWA World Junior Heavyweight Championship (2 times)
NWA World Tag Team Championship (Florida Version) (5 times) - with Duke Keomuka (4) and Dick Steinborn (1)
Georgia Championship Wrestling
NWA Columbus Heavyweight Championship (1 time)
Japan Wrestling Association
All Asia Tag Team Championship (1 time) - with Michiaki Yoshimura
New Japan Pro-Wrestling
NWA North American Tag Team Championship (Los Angeles/Japan version) (1 time) - with Masa Saito
Greatest 18 Club inductee
NWA Mid-America
NWA World Tag Team Championship (Mid-America Version) (1 time) - with Kanji Inoki
Mid Atlantic Championship Wrestling
NWA Mid-Atlantic Southern Heavyweight Championship (1 time)
Professional Wrestling Hall of Fame
Class of 2018
WWE
WWE Hall of Fame (Class of 2018)
Tokyo Sports
Service Award (1999)

References

External links
 
 

1937 births
1999 deaths
Deaths from cancer in Florida
Deaths from prostate cancer
Japanese male professional wrestlers
Japanese catch wrestlers
Professional Wrestling Hall of Fame and Museum
Professional wrestling managers and valets
Professional wrestling trainers
Sportspeople from Yokohama
The Four Horsemen (professional wrestling) members
Japanese emigrants to the United States
WWE Hall of Fame Legacy inductees
Stampede Wrestling alumni
20th-century professional wrestlers
All Asia Tag Team Champions
NWA World Junior Heavyweight Champions
NWA Florida Tag Team Champions
NWA Southern Heavyweight Champions (Florida version)
NWA World Tag Team Champions (Florida version)
NWA North American Tag Team Champions (Los Angeles/Japan version)